Noozhawk is an online newspaper that provides coverage for Santa Barbara County, California. While initially focused on the greater Santa Barbara area, Noozhawk expanded its coverage to the northern part of the county in the summer of 2014.

History 
In 2012, Noozhawk celebrated its 5th anniversary and hired Tom Bolton, a former reporter and editor with the Santa Barbara News-Press and Santa Maria Times, to be executive editor. By the 1st Quarter of 2020, the website was averaging more than 1.8 million page views per month, according to Quantcast.

References

External links

Santa Barbara, California